Charles Edward Gladwin (9 December 1887 – February 1952) was an English professional footballer who played as a full-back for Blackpool and Sunderland.

References

1887 births
1952 deaths
Footballers from Worksop
English footballers
Association football fullbacks
Blackpool F.C. players
Sunderland A.F.C. players
Watford F.C. players
English Football League players
FA Cup Final players